In mathematics, in the field of group theory, a subgroup  of a group  is called c-normal if there is a normal subgroup  of  such that  and the intersection of  and  lies inside the normal core of .

For a weakly c-normal subgroup, we only require  to be subnormal.

Here are some facts on c-normal subgroups:

Every normal subgroup is c-normal
Every retract is c-normal
Every c-normal subgroup is weakly c-normal

References
 Y. Wang, c-normality of groups and its properties, Journal of Algebra, Vol. 180 (1996), 954-965

Subgroup properties